Darryl Tyger Blackstock (born May 30, 1983) is a former American football linebacker. He was drafted by the Arizona Cardinals in the third round of the 2005 NFL Draft. He played college football at Virginia. He also played for the Cincinnati Bengals, Oakland Raiders and Florida Tuskers. He is currently the special teams coordinator and outside linebackers coach at William & Mary.

College career
Blackstock played college football at the University of Virginia. In 2004 Blackstock was selected to the Second-team All-ACC.

Professional career

Arizona Cardinals
Blackstock played three seasons in Arizona. From 2005-2007 Blackstock recorded 44 tackles, 4 sacks and 2 Forced fumbles.

Cincinnati Bengals
In 2008, Blackstock signed with the Bengals.

Florida Tuskers 
In 2010, Blackstock signed with Florida Tuskers of the United Football League.

Oakland Raiders
Returned to the NFL and signed with the Raiders. Blackstock played 16 games and started one game and recorded 20 tackles.

Baltimore Ravens
On July 25, 2012, Blackstock signed with Baltimore Ravens.

References

1983 births
Living people
Sportspeople from Newport News, Virginia
Players of American football from Virginia
American football defensive ends
American football linebackers
Virginia Cavaliers football players
Arizona Cardinals players
Cincinnati Bengals players
Virginia Destroyers players
Oakland Raiders players
Baltimore Ravens players
William & Mary Tribe football coaches